SS Noah Brown was a Liberty ship built in the United States during World War II. She was named after Noah Brown, an American shipbuilder, based in New York City, founded a company, along with his brother Adam, which was active between 1804 and 1833. They built several notable vessels, including Robert Fulton's Demologos, the first steam-powered warship, and numerous naval vessels on Lake Erie and Lake Champlain, during the War of 1812.

Construction
Noah Brown was laid down on 28 April 1944, under a Maritime Commission (MARCOM) contract, MC hull 2481, by the St. Johns River Shipbuilding Company, Jacksonville, Florida; and was launched on 8 June 1944.

History
She was allocated to the Seas Shipping Co., Inc., on 28 June 1944. She was sold for commercial use, 8 October 1947, to Bulk Carriers Corp. After several name and owner changes she was scrapped in Spain, in 1969.

References

Bibliography

 
 
 
 

 

Liberty ships
Ships built in Jacksonville, Florida
1944 ships